Brian Stack may refer to:
 Brian Stack (comedian) (born 1967), American actor, comedian, and writer
 Brian P. Stack (born 1966), New Jersey senator
 Brian Stack (prison officer) (1935/36–1984), shot by the IRA

See also
 Brian Stock (born 1981), footballer
 Brian Sack (born 1968), American writer and actor